is a former Japanese football player and manager.

Playing career
Yamada was born in Numazu on February 21, 1961. After graduating from Kokushikan University, he joined Honda in 1983. He retired in 1990.

Coaching career
After retirement, Yamada coached at Honda from 1990 to 1992. In 1992, he moved to Yamaha Motors (later Júbilo Iwata) and coached until 2001. In 2002, he moved to Shonan Bellmare. In May 2003, he became manager as Samir's successor and managed until July 2004. In 2010, he signed with Vanraure Hachinohe and managed until 2014.

Managerial statistics

References

External links

1961 births
Living people
Kokushikan University alumni
Association football people from Shizuoka Prefecture
Japanese footballers
Japan Soccer League players
Honda FC players
Japanese football managers
J2 League managers
Shonan Bellmare managers
Vanraure Hachinohe managers
Association football midfielders